Tautalatasi Tasi (born 22 November 1994) is a New Zealand professional rugby union footballer who currently plays as a wing for the Sunwolves in Super Rugby. He previously played rugby league for the South Sydney Rabbitohs in the National Rugby League.

Background
Born in Auckland, New Zealand, Tasi is of Samoan descent and moved to Queensland, Australia at a young age. He played his junior rugby league for the Goodna Eagles, before being signed by the Ipswich Jets in the Queensland Cup.

Tasi is the younger brother of former Sydney Roosters and Brisbane Broncos player Lama Tasi, and the cousin of Canterbury-Bankstown Bulldogs player Raymond Faitala-Mariner.

Playing career

Early career
In 2013 and 2014, Tasi played for the Ipswich Jets. In May 2014, he signed a 2-year contract with the Canterbury-Bankstown Bulldogs starting effective immediately, playing for their NYC team for the rest of the year. In 2015, he began pre-season training with the Bulldogs' NRL squad but did not make an appearance for their first-grade team, instead playing for their New South Wales Cup team for the season.

2016
In 2016, Tasi joined the North Sydney Bears in the Intrust Super Premiership NSW. During the season, he was elevated to the South Sydney Rabbitohs' NRL squad. In round 16 of the 2016 NRL season, he made his NRL debut for the Rabbitohs against the Penrith Panthers, coming off the bench. He spent most of the season playing with North Sydney where he made 13 appearances and scored 8 tries for the season.

2017
In May, Tasi played for the New South Wales Residents against the Queensland Residents. On 5 August, he scored 5 tries in a game for North Sydney against the Wests Tigers at Leichhardt Oval, North Sydney winning the match 42-10.  On 22 November 2017, Tasi announced on his official Instagram account that after 3 seasons he was leaving Norths and relocating back to Queensland.

2018 & beyond
Tasi spent the 2018 playing Queensland Premier Rugby for Souths, alongside Reds & Wallabies discards Quade Cooper & Karmichael Hunt, his performances for the premier grade side earned him a spot in the Brisbane City NRC squad for 2018.
Tasi then joined the Rebels in 2019 with Cooper as an extended pre-season squad member, making appearances in their pre-season trials and in a mid-season game for a Melbourne XV against Japan A (made up of flow-over Sunvwolves players & rookie test players). Tasi moved to Gordon Rugby Club based out of Sydney's North Shore playing in their premier competition, Shute Shield.

References

Super Rugby statistics

External links

South Sydney Rabbitohs profile

1994 births
New Zealand rugby union players
New Zealand rugby league players
New Zealand sportspeople of Samoan descent
South Sydney Rabbitohs players
North Sydney Bears NSW Cup players
Rugby league wingers
Rugby league centres
Ipswich Jets players
Rugby league second-rows
Rugby league players from Auckland
New Zealand emigrants to Australia
Living people
Rugby union centres
Rugby union wings
Brisbane City (rugby union) players
Melbourne Rebels players
New Zealand expatriate rugby union players
Expatriate rugby union players in Japan
Sunwolves players
New South Wales Waratahs players
Toronto Arrows players